The following lists events that happened during 1827 in Chile.

Incumbents
President of Chile: Agustín Eyzaguirre (-25 January), Ramón Freire (25 January-8 May), Francisco Antonio Pinto (-8 May)

Events

January
25 January - Eyzaguirre resigns after a failed coup

February
13 February - The Chilean presidential election, 1827 is held, electing Ramon Frieire as Eyzaguirre's successor.

May
8 May - Friere resigns the presidency and is replaced by vice president Pinto.

September
12 September - The newspaper El Mercurio's Valparaiso edition is first printed.

Births
 28 November - Adolfo Ibáñez (b. 1898)

Deaths

References 

 
Chile
Chile